Kenny Rogers and the First Edition, until 1970 billed as The First Edition, were an American rock band. The band's style was difficult to singularly classify,  as it incorporated elements of country, rock and psychedelic pop. Its stalwart members were Kenny Rogers (lead vocals and bass guitar), Mickey Jones (drums and percussion) and Terry Williams (guitar and vocals). The band formed in 1967, with folk musician Mike Settle (guitar and backing vocals) and the operatically-trained Thelma Camacho (lead vocals) completing the lineup.

As the counterculture of the 1960s was developing, the First Edition signed with Reprise Records in 1967 and had their first big hit in early 1968 with the psychedelic single "Just Dropped In (To See What Condition My Condition Was In)" (US No. 5). After other chart hits, "But You Know I Love You" (US No. 19) and "Tell It All Brother" (US No. 17), the group, newly billed as "Kenny Rogers and the First Edition", once again hit the top ten, this time in 1969 with the topical "Ruby, Don't Take Your Love to Town" (US No. 6, UK No.2).

For the next six years, the First Edition enjoyed worldwide success. By the mid-1970s, frontman Kenny Rogers had embarked on a solo music career, becoming one of the top-selling country artists of all time.

Early days
Kenny Rogers and The First Edition were mostly made up of former members of the New Christy Minstrels who felt creatively stifled. The exception was Mickey Jones, who had been part of Bob Dylan's backing group on his first electric world tour. In 1967, with the help of Terry Williams' mother, who worked for producer and executive Jimmy Bowen, they signed with Reprise and recorded their first single together, "I Found a Reason", which had minor sales. Like much of the work by the original lineup, this was a distinctly contemporary composition with an intensely performed Mike Settle vocal. Settle had first come up with the idea of forming the band as his work took on the characteristics of rock. Over the previous seven years, Settle had been writing decidedly more folk-oriented songs, most notably the oft-covered "Sing Hallelujah".

It was their follow-up (sung by Rogers), the psychedelic single "Just Dropped In (To See What Condition My Condition Was In)", that earned them their first brush with fame. The single, with an arrangement by their producer, Mike Post, had Glen Campbell playing the backward guitar intro and Mike Deasy providing various psychedelic sounds. It became a hit early in 1968, climbing to No. 5 on the Billboard Hot 100. Terry Williams played the solo that later led Jimi Hendrix to tell Rogers that it was his favorite record. The group's next three single releases failed commercially, as did their second album. The  1968 release "But You Know I Love You" (composed by Settle) possessed a distinctive brass-tinged country-folk sound, broadening their fan base. In the group's rendition on The Smothers Brothers Comedy Hour that aired on 8 December 1968, the audience was unwittingly fooled into applauding too soon, right after the false ending but well before the real ending. The record peaked at No. 19 on the Hot 100 just under a year after "Just Dropped In" was at its Billboard summit.

According to Mickey Jones' book That Would Be Me, Thelma was fired from the group in late 1968 (soon after the release of "But You Know I Love You" and the aforementioned Smothers Brothers television appearance, but before the record would chart on the Hot 100), after missing too many gigs and rehearsals. For her part Thelma did not see it the same way. She has stated that while she always loved being with them in the studio, the road was too hard on her from a health and personal standpoint. Slowly growing apart from the others, Camacho began to feel restricted by the band in a number of ways. All agreed that the situation could not continue, and she was replaced by her roommate, Mary Arnold, an Iowa-born singer who beat out newcomer Karen Carpenter for the job. Thelma appears on the first three LPs plus half of the fourth album.  Arnold made her debut on "Reuben James".

By the end of the decade Rogers had long brown hair, an earring, and pink sunglasses. Known affectionately in retrospect as "Hippie Kenny", Rogers had a notably smoother vocal style at the time. During mid-1969 the band scored another Top Ten hit with Mel Tillis' "Ruby, Don't Take Your Love to Town". The song was the global hit and established the First Edition's longevity in the business. Mickey's drumming was part of the hook. At Rogers' shows the song was often clapped along to, or joked around with, but it was meant seriously at the time. Telling the graphic story of a crippled veteran was admirably daring at the height of America's involvement with the war in Vietnam. The song lyrics were originally meant to address the Korean War, albeit in such a vague way that it could have referred to Korea, Vietnam, or even the Japanese attack on Pearl Harbor. The song was picked up by some of the more attuned disc jockeys, and there was suddenly great demand to release the final track recorded for, and included on, the First Edition '69 album. In order to release "Ruby" at the same time as the "But You Know I Love You" soundalike "Once Again She's All Alone", the group renamed themselves "Kenny Rogers and the First Edition". When "Ruby" became the hit, the name stuck. Terry later said  that this made him feel like one of Gladys Knight's Pips. This, their third major hit single, like the previous two featured Kenny Rogers on lead, along with the band name change, these factors cemented Kenny's fate as a global household name.

Prime period
"Ruby" made them stars, and during the next two years, Kenny Rogers and the First Edition had five hits. A man Rogers at first took to be a rude fan first pitched "Reuben James" to Rogers at a golf match. The man, who turned out to be a song pitcher for American songwriter Alex Harvey, followed him around the greens singing the song until Rogers listened. Rogers loved the song's look at a black man raising a white boy and agreed to record it. "Reuben James" turned out to be another daring record; though not as big a hit as "Ruby", it made a big impact on the First Edition's now sizable fan base. "Reuben James" came out at the end of 1969, by which time Mike Settle had been gone for several months, in an effort to save his ultimately doomed marriage. During his absence he was replaced by Kin Vassy. Vassy's style was a little more edgy than Settle's, allowing the band to explore different areas. It was now that Kenny and Terry, by default, became the leaders of the band. Kenny was in charge of the records, and Terry would take control of their stage presentation. The group continued to record country, rock, and folk by fairly equal measures, blurring the lines among the genres. Along with Jerry Lee Lewis, Johnny Cash and Elvis Presley, their records in the late 1960s brought country music to the city and rock and roll to the country. Even if Jones had not also discovered Don Henley, the First Edition should get credit for being pioneers of a more modern blend of rockabilly called country rock.

The First Edition reached what was arguably the peak of their fame with "Something's Burning", a No. 11 hit in early 1970. A blatantly sexual song, it was slightly hindered chart-wise by the controversy surrounding it. Regardless, Kenny's soft voice on verses and rock shouting on the chorus earned the group much acclaim. "Burning" opened with a sample of an actual heartbeat played backward to replicate the song's rhythmic beat.

Meanwhile, Terry Williams had begun to record some solo singles. A number of folk rock songs met with little success. He later switched to a more teen-oriented bubblegum sound that their manager Ken Kragen felt would appeal to his fans. Williams' "I'm Gonna Sing You A Sad Song Susie" was part of the First Edition's next LP Tell It All Brother. The title track (also written by Harvey), which dealt with love and brotherhood, was a national top 20 hit and topped WRKO's August 13, 1970, top 30 survey for one week. It was the first of many songs Kenny would sing (e.g., his solo "Coward of the County") that had elements of sadism under a gentle surface.  Released a month or so after the Kent State shootings, the song drew a standing ovation the night it debuted live.

In addition to the band's continuing frequent appearances on television, songs by Kenny Rogers and the First Edition were featured in two 1970 films. First up was the never released on record "If Nobody Loved" for the camp political comedy Flap. A few months later they recorded "Someone Who Cares" and "A Poem I Wrote For Your Hair" to appear in the soundtrack for the romantic film Fools starring Jason Robards, Jr., and Katharine Ross. The Fools (soundtrack) was released in 1971.
   
At the end of 1970, the First Edition had their seventh Top 40 hit with the Vassy-penned "Heed the Call". Another song about the need for brotherhood, it was seen as an uptempo counterpart to the balladry of "Tell It All Brother." The next single, "Someone Who Cares", was taken from the Fools movie soundtrack. Though scoring high on the easy listening charts, "Someone Who Cares" failed to reach the pop top fifty. This ushered in a period during which the First Edition attempted to retool its image. Keyboard player John Hobbs was briefly in the lineup, but, though he played on future recordings, was not in the group long enough to appear on any album covers or publicity photos. His brief tenure was captured in the PBS television special Tell It All. The special provided an unusually in-depth look at the group, all of whom were at ease speaking in front of the camera. In mid-1971 the First Edition released a gospel single called "Take My Hand", which barely scraped into the bottom of the charts.

TV and later releases
After the success of a pilot shot in late 1970, the fall of 1971 saw Kenny Rogers and the First Edition become hosts of their own television series Rollin' on the River. Later to be shortened to Rollin, this was a variety show that was taped in Canada (taking advantage of recently imposed Canadian content requirements) which geared itself toward rock, blues, and folk performers and groups. Unlike the more Las Vegas-styled  The Sonny & Cher Comedy Hour, Rollin was focused on harder-edged guests like Ike and Tina Turner, veterans like Bo Diddley, veteran Canadian based artists such as Ronnie Hawkins, and up and coming performers such as Jim Croce. The show also gave the First Edition a chance to do the comedy Kenny and Terry had long made a part of their act. Though it got good ratings, Rollin did have one ill side effect: the First Edition were now seen as television personalities instead of recording stars. Terry Williams' signature song, "What Am I Gonna Do", was to become the group's next single in late 1971. It was the first First Edition 45 not to chart since 1968.

Recorded over six months in 1971, and released in March 1972, The Ballad of Calico was written by future star Michael Murphey and the First Edition's musical director and arranger Larry Cansler. Cansler replaced Hobbs on stage during this period, but despite his large creative role here, and on Rollin' on the River, he was not promoted on either as a member of the group. The album was a country rock opera about a late 19th-century mining town, but unlike most like-minded projects of the era, all of the songs were based on fact. The sleeve and booklet of this two-LP set had genuine and period-styled photos depicting the era, with all of the lyrics presented in hand-written script. The music was critically well received, with all of the group (outside of Mickey) taking at least one lead. The song chosen for a single was "School Teacher," an acoustic rhythm and blues song with a lead by Kin. In retrospect it's easy to understand the probable reasons the artistically valid "School Teacher" didn't get past No. 91. Putting out a First Edition single where Rogers was not prominent had already shown itself to be a gamble, plus lyrics written to reflect the sexist views of the 19th century sounded odd outside of the LP's concept. "The Ballad Of Calico" has since picked up a large cult following, but back in 1972 it was all but ignored. Frustrated by the falling sales (the album hardly sold at all), Vassy began to let a drinking habit get out of control. According to Mickey Jones' book That Would Be Me, Vassy was fired several months after the "Calico's" release following a drunken backstage confrontation with Terry Williams.

By early 1972, Gene Lorenzo replaced Larry Cansler on stage and was made a full First Edition member. Jimmy Hassell joined the group about six months later to replace Vassy. Lorenzo was a keyboard and piano virtuoso. Hassell was a hard rock singer similar to Vassy, and physically resembled a friend of Terry's, actor Gary Busey. Both fit in well, without marring the public impression of the original members. Around the time the new members hopped on board, Rogers formed his own label, Jolly Rogers (distributed by MGM,  Rogers retained the name when he started his own publishing company as a solo artist) and the group left Reprise.

Their first Jolly Rogers release was a late 1972 country LP called Backroads. The third single from the album, a version of Merle Haggard's "Today I Started Loving You Again" reached the lower regions of the country charts in mid-1973. Then came a soundtrack from Rollin'. Now in its second year, an album of live versions of the "Calico" songs and hits like "Ruby," "Reuben James" and "Just Dropped In" could have sold quite well, bringing proven hits to the Jolly Rogers label at the same time. Instead, they delivered a set of cover songs, of which Kenny's remake of "The Long and Winding Road" and Gene and Terry's reworking of Bach's "Joy" were most notable. The album did not check the group's declining sales, and the TV show was soon canceled. The group increasingly played on the county fair circuit.

It was decided that a new image far away from their TV persona was required. Monumental tried to give them just this. Combining a wide variety of styles, it ranged from a Rogers-written rocker about prostitute "Morgana Jones" (later rerecorded by Rogers for his album The Gambler in 1978) to the nostalgic "42nd Street." The later compared the New York of 1973 to the Broadway of the 1930s. As he would continue to do in his solo career, Rogers cloaked some mature subject matter with a gentle delivery. The Dr. John-inspired medley of Alex Harvey compositions "The Hoodooin' of Miss Fannie Deberry" (also re-recorded by Rogers for "The Gambler") and "The Ritual", was the LP's centerpiece. Though in tune with other music of the day, Monumental was one of their biggest sales failures in the United States, but in New Zealand it went gold. Following on the local success of "Rollin'" and the understated ballad "Lady, Play Your Symphony," Kenny's rocking nursery rhyme "Lena Lookie" went to number six, and the group embarked on three New Zealand tours over the next two years. A documentary of their first trip, in late 1973, was aired as a 1975 TV special, Rollin Through New Zealand.

As their domestic popularity continued to decline, Terry wanted to focus on the hard rockers that had done so well for them overseas. Kenny disagreed, wanting a more conservative agenda. Kenny admitted in his book Making It with Music, that he perhaps should not have complained about MGM's poor distribution on a radio show, but despite their mounting problems, New Zealand continued to consider the First Edition as superstars. The problem was that they had to go halfway around the world to benefit from their success, and travel expenses ate a big chunk out of their profits. As a thank you they put together an album called I'm Not Making My Music for Money especially for their New Zealand fans. An LP of this title was to have come out in the US but MGM rejected it. The US LP was basically going to be the same but with two new cuts replacing the two songs reused from "Monumental."  Despite the retreads, the album did show continued development. A mix of new songs and remakes (possibly done because some songs were not available in New Zealand), "Love Woman" was now a hard rock jam featuring Jimmy on lead. This arrangement was borrowed from the band's stage performances of Bill Haley's "Rockin' Through the Rye". The ballads "Dirty Work" and "Daddy Was a Traveling Man" were a return to the more adult style of Terry's early work. "Making Music for Money" (another song remade for "The Gambler") is a song about art vs. commerce that Jimmy Buffett later covered. It was the band's ironic last single. It charted well, but again only in New Zealand.

The split
A last-ditch effort to jumpstart their domestic careers was done in late 1974 when they filmed a television movie called The Dream Makers. A drama about the music biz, they played the group Catweazel. It was a small role with only Kenny and Mickey speaking any major lines. Despite the film giving them a chance to perform recent songs, the exposure did not halt their decline. Kenny had become short on money by 1974, and was in debt when he decided to hawk guitar lesson records on a commercial.

Wanting to give a solo career a shot, Terry left in the late spring of 1975. Kenny was upset but agreed to it, succeeding in getting Kin to come back so they could fill their pending engagements. Though he was hired to stay permanently, the reunion with Vassy did not go well and he ended up playing only one night. This more or less marked the point where the First Edition agreed to split. Mickey, realizing that it was time to move on, was the first to decide to leave in order to pursue his other dream, which was acting. Though the group would finish their pending obligations, Kenny began recording as a solo act that fall. The First Edition played their last scheduled shows in the fall of 1975 at Harrah's in Reno. Without Mickey Jones there were a few First Edition gigs in early 1976, done as a favor to Kenny who had not yet formed his solo band. Kenny later said that writing the song "Sweet Music Man" made him cut his hair and let it go gray, plus get rid of the earring. The song may have played a part in his future middle of the road image, but the change did not happen until almost a year after it was written. Mary Arnold often sang "Sweet Music Man" on the First Edition's post Terry Williams gigs and Kenny also tried the lead out a few times. This was to become one of Rogers' most covered compositions, and he himself had a No. 9 country hit with it in the fall of 1977. Though unrecorded, "Sweet Music Man" marked the end of the First Edition as a creative entity.

After the split
Considering the band's then low profile, Kenny Rogers had an uncertain future when he signed a solo deal to United Artists in 1975. Searching for a new image, he soon developed a more middle-of-the-road, gravel-voiced style. For the rest of the decade and beyond he had hit after hit. "Lucille" was the first of no less than a combined 25 number 1 country and pop singles after he left the group. During his time with UA (later taken over by Liberty) he topped the country and pop album charts for a grand total of 90 weeks and sold more records than anyone in country music. In 1983 his status as one of the world's top stars (of any musical genre) was confirmed when RCA Records signed him for an advance sum of US$20 million, for six albums. Kenny Rogers continued to tour, including classic material by the First Edition in his performances, before retiring in 2017.  In April 2013, he was inducted into the Country Music Hall of Fame. Rogers died on March 20, 2020.

Thelma Camacho did a few solo records in the 1960s and 1970s and one LP in 1980. She moved to Europe in the 1980s and lost contact with the rest of the group until 2010. Thelma also recorded in Europe under the name Tess Ivie (the latter being her husband's last name). Today, she lives in California and runs a jewelry store.

Mary Arnold married singer Roger Miller, after the two were introduced by Rogers, and now looks after his estate. She had performed with him for many years, and in 2009 was inducted into the Iowa Rock And Roll Hall Of Fame.

Kin Vassy died of lung cancer on June 23, 1994. He scored two top 40 hit singles as a country singer, but his solo career never really took off. He often worked with Kenny in the 1980s and his trademark scream enlivens hits like "Blaze Of Glory". In 1980 he released the single "Makes Me Wonder (If I Ever Said Goodbye)"; Kenny Rogers sang the backing vocals. The song was not a hit, but the following year Kenny recorded his own version of the song for his popular Share Your Love album, produced by Lionel Richie; Vassy sang the back up on Kenny's version. He also worked with Frank Zappa and Elvis Presley. Two years after he died, Martina McBride had a No. 28 hit on the U.S. country survey with the Vassy penned "Phones Are Ringing (All Over Town)".

Gene Lorenzo  performed for some years with country star Lee Greenwood, then some more years with Kathy Mattea. When Greenwood fired his band in 1987, Kenny asked Gene if he would like to join his stage band "Bloodline" until he found a new group. Lorenzo stayed for roughly six months. He is still listed as a working musician.

Terry Williams had one easy listening hit in 1980 called "Blame It On The Night," but it was on a small label. He worked extensively with Kenny in the 1980s and managed Kenny's successful Lion Share recording studios. Today Terry is mostly retired, on a farm in the Southeast. He now composes and sings Christian music.

Kin and Terry fronted a new First Edition in 1993–94. They continued on a few months after Vassy's death, but the circumstances were now too downbeat and they disbanded several months later. It was to be an attempt at relaunching the group as a contemporary country band who also played their hits. Terry's younger brother Ress played the drums.

Having continued to write and perform, Mike Settle opened for the First Edition on their 1973 trek to New Zealand. He would go on to write several songs for the group's solo records over the years. By the 1980s, Mike had a lower profile in the music industry, and later became a journalist. Now basically retired, his songs ("But You Know I Love You" in particular) continue to be covered by new artists.

Jimmy Hassell worked for Anne Murray for a while and after Mary married Roger Miller he worked with them as well. He released one self-titled solo LP in 1976 which was reissued with one new song in 1978, and also wrote commercial jingles. His biggest success as a solo artist came in 1977 when he produced the award-winning production show Sassy Class at the Stardust hotel. He died on January 6, 2004.

Mickey Jones became the most visible member next to Kenny. Focused more on acting, he was in many films and television shows over the years, including films such as Sling Blade and The Fighting Temptations. He also had a role in Tim Allen's Home Improvement for two seasons. He died on February 7, 2018.

John Hobbs stayed in touch with the group and worked with Kenny, Terry, and Kin on Rogers' early 1980s solo work as well as other projects at Lion Share. He has remained an active session musician and arranger.

The groups' long time arranger Larry Cansler had a successful career in the studios in Los Angeles scoring many movies (including The Gambler series), variety shows, (the Smothers Brothers Comedy Hour) and many national commercials. He now lives in Arizona and continues to compose for symphony orchestras.

In 1980, a compilation of some of the First Edition's greatest hits and album cuts, titled "Shine On", was issued in the United Kingdom; it sold fairly well but was overshadowed by The Kenny Rogers Singles Album, a Kenny Rogers solo greatest hits collection that, in addition to his solo hits, featured reworkings of the group's best known songs. 
 
Currently there are many compilations of their work in print on various labels, some miscredited to Kenny alone with picture not of the period.

"Live Vegas '72" is the first new First Edition music to be released since 1974. The recording was a Kin Vassy era performance of an unknown date. Jimmy is oddly credited and there are other basic mistakes on the cover.

The band scored a total of 11 hit singles and eight hit albums on the Billboard charts.

On April 10, 2010, Kenny, Mike, Mickey, Terry, Mary, and Gene reunited as part of the Kenny Rogers: The First 50 Years TV special. This was filmed at the Foxwoods Resort Casino in Connecticut. They were joined by Wynonna Judd on a rendition of "Just Dropped In".

The First Edition semi-reunited with Rogers several times in 2014-2015 when he was elected to the Country Music Hall Of Fame. These were brief press conferences and performances only.

Discography

Albums
{| class="wikitable" 
|-
! rowspan="2"| Year
! rowspan="2"| Album
! colspan="2"| Chart positions
! rowspan="2"| RIAA
|-
! style="width:50px;"|US
! style="width:50px;"|CAN
|-
| 1967
| The First Edition
| style="text-align:center;"| 118
| style="text-align:center;"| —
| style="text-align:center;"| —
|-
| 1968
| The First Edition's 2nd
| style="text-align:center;"| —
| style="text-align:center;"| —
| style="text-align:center;"| —
|-
| rowspan="2"| 1969
| The First Edition '69
| style="text-align:center;"| 164
| style="text-align:center;"| —
| style="text-align:center;"| —
|-
| Ruby, Don't Take Your Love To Town
| style="text-align:center;"| 48
| style="text-align:center;"| 52
| style="text-align:center;"| —
|-
| rowspan="2"| 1970
| Something's Burning
| style="text-align:center;"| 26
| style="text-align:center;"| 47
| style="text-align:center;"| —
|-
| Tell It All Brother
| style="text-align:center;"| 61
| style="text-align:center;"| 42
| style="text-align:center;"| —
|-
| rowspan="3"| 1971
| Fools (soundtrack)
| style="text-align:center;"| —
| style="text-align:center;"| —
| style="text-align:center;"| —
|-
| Greatest Hits
| style="text-align:center;"| 57
| style="text-align:center;"| 33
| style="text-align:center;"| Platinum
|-
| Transition
| style="text-align:center;"| 155
| style="text-align:center;"| —
| style="text-align:center;"| —
|-
| rowspan="2"| 1972
| The Ballad of Calico
| style="text-align:center;"| 118
| style="text-align:center;"| —
| style="text-align:center;"| —
|-
| Backroads
| style="text-align:center;"| —
| style="text-align:center;"| —
| style="text-align:center;"| —
|-
| rowspan="2"| 1973
| Rollin'''
| style="text-align:center;"| —
| style="text-align:center;"| —
| style="text-align:center;"| —
|-
| Monumental| style="text-align:center;"| —
| style="text-align:center;"| —
| style="text-align:center;"| —
|-
| 1974
| I'm Not Making Music for Money (New Zealand Only)
| style="text-align:center;"| —
| style="text-align:center;"| —
| style="text-align:center;"| —
|-
| 2015
| Live Vegas '72 (500 vinyl only)
| style="text-align:center;"| —
| style="text-align:center;"| —
| style="text-align:center;"| —
|}

Singles

 Available on DVD
 2005:  Kenny Rogers: Going Home-Live at the House Of Blues UK DVD compatible with US format contains a 1994 Disney Channel documentary. Includes a five-minute First Edition segment with rare footage.
 2005:  Remember The 70's 60 min compilation of Rollin' hosted by Mickey Jones. Two First Edition performances are included as well as their intros for other artists.
 2006:  Kenny Rogers – The Journey with the First Edition Dottie West, Willie Nelson, and Dolly Parton 2007:  Flashbacks: Pop Parade (includes selections from the View Video Rollin' releases)
 2007:  Flashbacks: Easy Lovin’ (includes selections from the View Video Rollin' releases)
 2007:   Kenny Rogers: Rollin' Volume 1 with the First Edition, Ike Turner, Tina Turner, Gladys Knight & the Pips 2007:   Kenny Rogers: Rollin' Volume 2 with the First Edition, Jim Croce, Bo Diddley, and Ronnie Hawkins Note: all View Video releases were originally issued on VHS in the early nineties.

Numerous releases with miscellaneous Rollin' footage have come out in Europe and Australia. They are of dubious legality and were all were quickly pulled from the market.

Further reading
 Rogers, Kenny (1978). Making It with Music. New York: Harper & Row. .
Information on how to start an entertainment career. Insight on the First Edition in photos, their image, their music, how they got along etc.
 Jones, Mickey (2007) That Would Be Me. Bloomington, Indiana: AuthorHouse. 
 Mickey's autobiography contains previously unknown info on the First Edition. Photo section on the group is included.
Hume, Martha (1980). Kenny Rogers: Gambler, Lover, Dreamer''. New York: New American Library. 
Short biography of Rogers that goes into personal detail not covered in his own book.

Documentaries
 "Tell It All"-Airdate: syndicated in fall of 1972. A PBS special filmed in early 1971 during a date in South Carolina. Goes backstage, shows rehearsals, and has in depth interviews with all of the group. Some of this was reused in "Kenny Rogers-The Journey". The rest is yet to be released on home video.
 "Rollin' Through New Zealand"-Airdate: syndicated in early 1975. The First Edition star in this look at their visits and success in New Zealand. No official home video released, but producer Tony Williams put it online.
 "Kenny Rogers: A Gambler's Tale"-A&E Biography 1999. Kenny and Mike Settle are interviewed for this 60 min doc. Was available on VHS
 "The Life and Times of Kenny Rogers"-CMT 2002. In depth look at Rogers includes interviews with Kenny, Mickey Jones, and Terry Williams
 "Kenny Rogers-The Journey"-DVD 2006. A performance based documentary, that devotes about a quarter of its two-hour playing time to the First Edition. Includes vintage and new interviews with Rogers, as well as a new one by Mickey Jones.

References

External links
 Mickey's site has photos and memories of his long career
 
 

American country rock groups
American pop rock music groups
Musical groups established in 1967
Musical groups disestablished in 1976
1967 establishments in California
1976 disestablishments in California
Reprise Records artists